Gmina Istebna is a rural gmina (administrative district) in Cieszyn County, Silesian Voivodeship, in southern Poland, in the historical region of Cieszyn Silesia. Its seat is the village of Istebna.

Neighbouring gminas
Gmina Istebna is bordered by the gminas of Milówka, Rajcza and Wisła. It also borders the Czech Republic and Slovakia.

Twin towns – sister cities

Gmina Istebna is twinned with:
 Trzebiatów, Poland

References

External links
 

Istebna
Cieszyn County
Cieszyn Silesia